Mluleki Nobanda (born 15 November 1968) is a South African long-distance runner who competes in half marathons and marathons. He was a team gold medallist at the 1999 IAAF World Half Marathon Championships with Hendrick Ramaala and Abner Chipu after finishing tenth with a personal best time of 62:17 minutes.

He has won marathons in three continents, having taken the Belgrade Marathon in 2001, Taipei International Marathon in 2002, and numerous marathons in South Africa. He has also won the prestigious 56 km Two Oceans Marathon. He achieved his personal best at the 1999 Reims Marathon, running a time of 2:12:13 hours for third. He won the Cape Town Marathon in 2007 at the age of 39.

International competitions

Circuit wins
Cape Town Marathon: 2007
Two Oceans Marathon: 2003
Taipei International Marathon: 2002
Belgrade Marathon: 2001
Soweto Marathon: 2001

Personal bests
Half marathon – 1:02:17 (1999)
Marathon – 2:12:13	(1999)

References

External links

1968 births
Living people
South African male long-distance runners
South African male marathon runners
Commonwealth Games competitors for South Africa
Athletes (track and field) at the 1998 Commonwealth Games
Taipei Marathon male winners